Island council elections were held in the Netherlands Antilles on 9 May (Bonaire and Curaçao) and 23 May 2003 (SSS islands) to elect the members of the island councils of its five island territories. The election was won by the Bonaire Patriotic Union (6 seats) in Bonaire, the Workers' Liberation Front (8 seats) in Curaçao, the Windward Islands People's Movement (3 seats) in Saba, the Democratic Party Statia (3 seats) in Sint Eustatius, and the Democratic Party (6 seats) in Sint Maarten.

Results

Bonaire

Curaçao

Saba

Sint Eustatius

Sint Maarten

References

Netherlands
2003 in the Netherlands Antilles
2003 in Sint Maarten
May 2003 events in North America
Elections in the Netherlands Antilles
Elections in Bonaire
Elections in Curaçao
Elections in Saba (island)
Elections in Sint Eustatius
Elections in Sint Maarten
Election and referendum articles with incomplete results